Language Spoken at Home is a data set published by the United States Census Bureau on languages in the United States. It is based on a three-part language question asked about all household members who are five years old or older. The first part asks if the person speaks a language other than English at home. If the answer is 'yes,' the respondent is asked what that language is. The third part of the question asks how well the person speaks English ("Very well,' "Well," "not well," "Not at all").

The three-part question was first asked in 1980; It replaced a question about mother tongue. In 2000, the language question appeared on the long-form questionnaire which was distributed to 1 out of 6 households. After the long form census was eliminated (after the 2000 census), the language question was moved to the American Community Survey (ACS). The language questions used by the US Census changed numerous times during 20th century. Changes in the language questions are tied to the changing ideologies of language in addition to changing language policies.

Data published 
The published data varies in the amount of detail provided each year. 

In 2000 and 1990, language spoken was a part of Summary File 3. For the 2000 census, data was published for 30 languages, chosen for their nationwide distribution, and 10 language groupings (see list below). Data from households which report languages other than the 30 are reported under the language groupings. Thus, languages which are widespread in certain areas of the country but not nationally get put together, even in block level data. Lithuanian, and Welsh are simply "Other Indo-European languages," Yoruba and Swahili are simply "African languages," and Indonesian and Hakka are simply "Other Asian languages." Several locally very well represented languages, such as Punjabi and Pennsylvania German, are collated into smaller groupings. Native North American languages besides Navajo are also collated, though they are reported on several geographic levels in another data set.  

For the 2009-2013 ACS data, detailed information was provided on over 300 languages. In addition to the number of speakers reported for each language, the count of speakers whose English speaking ability is less than "very well" is also reported. 

Updated information is available via the Census Bureau's American Fact-finder.

Data usage 
Statistics on English-speaking ability and language spoken at home are used by the Justice Department in the implementation of the Voting Rights Act and to allocate funds for to schools for programs for English Language Learners. Federal and local governments, as well as non-governmental and private interests also use these statistics.

Languages and language groupings 

 English
 Spanish or Spanish Creole
 French (incl. Patois, Cajun)
 Nepali
 German
 Italian
 Portuguese or Portuguese Creole
 Romanian
 Yiddish
 Dutch (and Afrikaans) (West Germanic languages)
 Scandinavian languages
 Greek
 Russian
 Polish
 Albanian
 Croatian 
 Serbian
 Other Slavic languages
 Armenian
 Persian
 Bengali
 Gujarati
 Hindi
 Urdu
 Kurdish
 Marathi
 Other Indic languages (besides Gujarati, Hindi, Bengali, Urdu and Marathi)
 Other Indo-European languages (besides the above 20 languages and 3 groupings)
 Tamil (South Indian - Dravidian)
 Malayalam (South Indian - Dravidian)
 Kannada (South Indian - Dravidian)
 Telugu (South Indian - Dravidian)
 Chinese (all varieties, including "Formosan" (i.e. Taiwanese Hokkien))
 Japanese
 Korean
 Mon-Khmer, Cambodian
 Miao, Hmong
 Filipino, (including Tagalog and Ilocano)
 Thai
 Laotian
 Vietnamese
 Other Asian languages (besides the above 11 languages)
 Navajo
 Other Native North American languages
 Hungarian
 Arabic
 Hebrew
 African languages
 Assyrian language (including Suret and Turoyo)
 Other and unspecified languages

See also 
Languages of the United States
Languages in censuses
Ancestry (United States Census)
Historical racial and ethnic demographics of the United States
Race and ethnicity in the United States census
List of U.S. communities where English is not the majority language spoken at home

References

External links
Language Use (Official US Census)
American Fact-finder (Official US Census)

Demographics of the United States
Languages of the United States